FC Precizia Săcele is a Romanian football club from Săcele, Brașov County, founded in 1950. They currently compete in the Liga IV, rejoining senior competitions from the 2013–14 season, after they retired from the Liga III during the 2008–09 season due to financial reasons.

History
In the year 1950, the team of the Electroprecizia Factory from the City of Săcele (Brașov County) was established, under the name of Fotbal Club Precizia Săcele.

In the 1950–51 season, the newly founded team makes its first appearance in the Romanian football competitions, starting to play in the Regional League of Brașov County (at the time, Stalin Region), also known as Divizia D – Brașov (a group of the Romanian Fourth League, belonging to Brașov County). This is the league where the only team from the City of Săcele will continue to play for the next 20 years, among other teams from the County of Braşov, registering average results.

In the 1972–73 season, Precizia Săcele finishes on first place in the league and obtains a promotion to Division C, the Romanian Third League, achieving its first major success. In the 1973–74 season, it makes its debut in the Romanian Third League, finishing on fifth place of the table.

In the 1981–82 season season, the club becomes the champion of the Third League, finishing on the first place of the table, and registers the second major success, by winning the promotion to Division B, the Romanian Second League. At its debut in the Second League, in the 1982–83 season, it is unable to avoid relegation, finishing on the last place of the table.

Therefore, in the 1983–84 season, it returns to the Third League, where it will play until the 1991–92 season when it finishes in seventh place in the table, but it relegates to the Fourth League, as a result of the reduction of the number of teams playing in the Third League. After three years, Precizia Săcele promotes to the Third League, in the 1994–95 season, after finishing in first place in the table.

Only one year later, in the 1995–96 season, the club wins the promotion to the Second League, after finishing on the first place of the table. The next season will mark the third major success and the best performance in the history of the team, Precizia Săcele finishing on the second place of the table in the Second League, being very close to win the promotion to Division A, the Romanian First League. After five years spent in the Second League, in the 2000–01 season, the club finishes on the penultimate place of the table in the Second League and relegates to the Third League.

The next season, the team is very close to return to the Second League, finishing on the second place of the table in its league, but it will win the promotion to the Second League just one year later, in the 2002–03 season, when it finishes on the first place of the table in the Third League.

In the 1983–84 season, the team achieves its best performance in the Romanian Cup, winning all ten preliminary rounds, played against other teams from Brașov County, and reaching to the round of the Sixteen Finals, where it is eliminated by Dinamo Brașov, which wins the match with the score of 1–0. Later on, the team was coached by Ferencz Bajko.

In the 2006–07 season, the team changes its name to Fotbal Club Săcele, as the most important sponsor, the Factory Electroprecizia, withdrew its financial support and ceded the stadium and the playing field in the property of the local authorities. As a result, the Municipality became the most important supporter of the team FC Săcele and the owner of the stadium, playing field and training base situated nearby. The local stadium, where the team plays its home matches, is called the Electroprecizia Stadium and has a total capacity of 3,500 seats. The club is one of the teams with tradition from Brașov County and last time played in the Liga III, in the 2008–09 season, rejoining senior competitions from the 2013–14 season, in the Liga V, as Fotbal Club Precizia Săcele.
From 2015-16 the team is playing Liga IV and won 2 Romania's Cup 2018 and 2019.

Honours

Leagues
Liga II
Runners-up (1): 1996–97
Liga III
Winners (2): 1981–82, 1995–96
Runners-up (2): 2001–02, 2002–03
Liga IV – Brașov County
Winners (3): 1972–73, 1992–93, 1994–95
Runners-up (1): 2018–19

Cups
Cupa României – Brașov County
Winners (2): 2017–18, 2018–19

Club officials

Board of directors

Current technical staff

References

External links

Football clubs in Brașov County
Association football clubs established in 1950
Liga II clubs
Liga III clubs
1950 establishments in Romania
Săcele